Luis Carlos García (born September 22, 1975 in Hermosillo, Sonora, Mexico) is a Mexican former Major League Baseball outfielder who played with the Baltimore Orioles in 2002. He made the team's Opening Day roster, but was optioned to the Rochester Red Wings on April 12 after playing in two games without a plate appearance. He was recalled a month later on May 17. Garcia played for the Dorados de Chihuahua of the Mexican League in 2010.

References

External links

1975 births
Living people
Baltimore Orioles players
Baseball players at the 2003 Pan American Games
Baseball players from Sonora
Central American and Caribbean Games bronze medalists for Mexico
Competitors at the 2006 Central American and Caribbean Games
Dorados de Chihuahua players
Gulf Coast White Sox players
Hickory Crawdads players
Leones de Yucatán players
Major League Baseball outfielders
Major League Baseball players from Mexico
Mayos de Navojoa players
Mexican expatriate baseball players in the United States
Mexican League baseball outfielders
Pan American Games bronze medalists for Mexico
Pan American Games medalists in baseball
Piratas de Campeche players
Rochester Red Wings players
Rojos del Águila de Veracruz players
South Bend Silver Hawks players
Tigres de la Angelopolis players
Tigres del México players
Yaquis de Obregón players
Vaqueros Laguna players
Winston-Salem Warthogs players
Sportspeople from Hermosillo
Central American and Caribbean Games medalists in baseball
Medalists at the 2003 Pan American Games